Mario Hernández Sepúlveda (March 8, 1936 - 9 June 2015) was a Mexican film director and screenwriter. He was best known for collaborating with Antonio Aguilar in films such as Valente Quintero (1973).

References

External links

1936 births
2015 deaths
Mexican film directors
Mexican screenwriters
People from Coahuila